Yoshito "Tom" Yasumi (born August 20, 1965 in Tokyo, Japan) is a Japanese-born American animator and director best known for his work on SpongeBob SquarePants as well as Rocko’s Modern Life.

Yasumi was the animation director on SpongeBob SquarePants from the beginning of the series to season 12. He also worked as an animation director on one other Nicktoon, Sanjay and Craig.

Filmography

Television

Film

Shorts

References

External links
 

Living people
1965 births
People from Tokyo
Japanese animators
Japanese animated film directors
Japanese television directors